Ivan Hudač (born 10 August 1971) is a Slovak cross-country skier. He competed in the men's 10 kilometre classical event at the 1998 Winter Olympics.

References

1971 births
Living people
Slovak male cross-country skiers
Olympic cross-country skiers of Slovakia
Cross-country skiers at the 1998 Winter Olympics
People from Poprad District
Sportspeople from the Prešov Region